Frank McNamara may refer to:

Frank McNamara (musician), Irish arranger, conductor, composer, and pianist
Frank McNamara (RAAF officer) (1894–1961), Australian Victoria Cross recipient and air force officer
Frank L. McNamara Jr. (born 1947), United States Attorney for the District of Massachusetts, 1987–1989
Frank X. McNamara, co-founder of Diners Club

See also
Francis McNamara (disambiguation)